This is a list of US trails used for walking, hiking, and other activities.

Alabama
 List of hiking trails in Alabama

District of Columbia
 Anacostia Riverwalk Trail,  ; Anacostia Riverfront, DC
 Downtown Heritage Trail; Washington, DC
 Greater U Street Heritage Trail; Washington, DC
 Metropolitan Branch Trail,  ; Union Station, DC to Silver Spring, Maryland
 Mount Vernon Trail, ; Mount Vernon Estate, DC to Theodore Roosevelt National Island, DC
 Rock Creek Trails, ; Washington, DC

Maine
 List of hiking trails in Maine

Maryland
 List of hiking trails in Maryland

Massachusetts 

 Midstate Trail, 92 miles (148 km) through Worcester County, Massachusetts

Minnesota
 List of hiking trails in Minnesota

Rhode Island
 The North–South Trail is a 77-mile (124 km) hiking trail that runs the length of Rhode Island

Wisconsin 
 List of hiking trails in Wisconsin

See also 

 National Trails System
 National Millennium Trail project – 16 long-distance trails selected in 2000 as visionary trails that reflect defining aspects America's history and culture
 Trail, long-distance trail
 List of long-distance trails, Long-distance trails in the United States, List of rail trails
 State wildlife trails (United States)
 Walking, hiking, backpacking
 Appalachian Long Distance Hikers Association
 List of longest cross-country trails in the world

References